, born , was a prominent Japanese martial artist, researcher and author. Regarded as the 14th and final heir to the Kōga-ryū Wada-ha Ninjutsu tradition, he was highly respected by his peers and a core member of Japan's classical martial arts community.

Biography
Isamu Fujita was born in Tokyo, and studied Kōga-ryū Wada-ha (Ninjutsu) under the tutelage of  his grandfather, Fujita Shintazaemon, 13th Soke of the Wada branch of Kōga-ryū Ninjutsu. He was educated at both Waseda and Meiji universities, and initially began his career at a newspaper company. He went on to study several other martial arts and was also noted as an author, researcher and collector of ancient scrolls. According to some references, "opinions are divided if he was a real ninja or a mere budō researcher."

During World War II, Fujita taught Koga Ryu Ninjutsu in the Army Academy of Nakano (Rikugun Nakano Gakkō). Fujita later worked as a government security specialist. In later years he was influential in teaching many traditional Japanese arts. Notable students include Motokatsu Inoue, Mabuni Kenwa, Saito Satoshi, Fujitani Masatoshi, actor Tomisaburo Wakayama and Manzo Iwata, who became heir to some of his styles. Fujita left no official heir for Kōga-ryū Wada Ha.

Seiko Fujita published Zukai Torinawajutsu showing hundreds of Hojōjutsu ties from many different schools, and several other texts on ninjutsu and martial arts. He died of cirrhosis of the liver at about the age of 68 and likely suffered from hereditary angioedema (which can preclude the practice of martial arts, although Fujita may have demonstrated the ability to overcome some disease symptoms). His vast collection of books, scrolls and historical documents, the Fujita Seiko Bunko, is housed at the Odawara Library in Kanagawa Prefecture. His collection of historical weapons, tools and attire were bequeathed to the Iga Ryu Ninja Museum in Mie Prefecture.

Bibliography of the main works

Title in Japanese kanji / Transcription of the Japanese title with occidental alphabet / Translation of the Japanese title / Year of publication

  "Hōjutsu Yarikata Etoki", "Illustrated guidance of Budo tricks" ;
  "Ninjutsu hiroku", "Secrets notes about ninjutsu" ;
  "Ninjutsu to wa?", "What is Ninjutsu" ;
Translated into English in 2017 by Eric Shahan.
  « Ninjutsu kara Supai-sen e »  « From ninjutsu to spy warfare »  
  "Shintō Musō-ryū Jōjutsu Zukai", "The illustrated technique of the way of the short staff from Shintō Musō-ryū »
  "Doronron : Saigo no Ninja", "The last ninja"
 , "Kenpō Gokui Atemi Satsu-Kappō Meikai", "The technique of strike the vital points from the Kenpō for kill or revive"

In 1972, a big part of this book has been translated in French by Jacques Devêvre, and published by the editions « Judo international », with the title : « Les points vitaux secrets du corps humain » (« The secret vital points of the human body »), then re-published in 1998, by « Budo editions », with the title : « L’art ultime et sublime des points vitaux » (« The magnificent and ultimate art of the vital points ») (with commentaries by Henry Plée)

  "Zukai Shurikenjutsu", "The illustrated technique of the shuriken"
  "Zukai Hojōjutsu" / "Zukai Torinawajutsu", "The illustrated technique of the binding rope"

References

Further reading
Fujita Seiko:: The Last Koga Ninja by Phillip T. Hevener (19 February 2008) 
What is Ninjutsu? by Fujita Seiko (English translation) (21 January 2017) 

1898 births
1966 deaths
Japanese ninjutsu practitioners
Japanese people of World War II
People from Tokyo
Deaths from cirrhosis
Place of death missing
Alcohol-related deaths in Japan